Ross Warren was an Australian journalist for WIN TV who was killed as part of the Gay Gang Murders on . Having disappeared after a night out with friends on Oxford Street, Warren's car was discovered outside Marks Park, Sydney, a popular gay beat, and his car keys two days later at the bottom of the adjoining cliffs. Police initially theorized that Warren had faked his own disappearance, concluding after four days that he had accidentally fallen into the sea. A search was undertaken, however his body was never recovered. In 2005, the case was recategorised as a homicide, the previous investigation being described as "grossly inadequate" and "shameful" by then-deputy coroner Jacqueline Milledge. Today his murder is seen as one of many slayings and hate-crimes committed on the cliffs of Marks Park in the 1980s and 90s. His name is listed on a memorial to the victims of these crimes located at the site.

See also 

 Gay Gang Murders

References 

Unsolved crimes in Australia
1964 births
1989 deaths
Australian LGBT journalists
Australian gay men
Gay journalists
People murdered in Sydney
Victims of anti-LGBT hate crimes
1989 murders in Australia
Violence against gay men
1980s in Sydney